Rosedale Apartments are a historic apartment house at 1180 Narragansett Boulevard in Cranston, Rhode Island.  This U-shaped apartment block stands overlooking Narragansett Bay, with three stories facing the street and four toward the bay.  The Art Moderne structure was designed by Herbert R. Hunt and built in 1939–40.  It is a rare statewide example of a large-scale building in this style, and was one of only a few built in Cranston before the Second World War.

The building was listed on the National Register of Historic Places in 2007.

See also
National Register of Historic Places listings in Providence County, Rhode Island

References

Residential buildings on the National Register of Historic Places in Rhode Island
Residential buildings completed in 1939
Buildings and structures in Cranston, Rhode Island
National Register of Historic Places in Providence County, Rhode Island